George Calavassy (February 2, 1881 in Greece – November 7, 1957 in Greece) was a Catholic prelate belonging to Apostolic Exarchate of Constantinople from 13 July 1920 to 11 June 1932, and Exarch of the Greek Byzantine Catholic Church from 11 June 1932 to 7 November 1957.

Biography
After receiving theological education was ordained priest on June 29, 1906. On 13 July 1920 Pope Benedict XV appointed George Calavassy Exarch to Constantinople and titular bishop of Theodoropolis. On 15 August 1920 he was ordained bishop by Isaias Papadopoulos and Denis Leonid Varouhas. On 11 June 1932 Pope Pius XI made him the Apostolic Exarch to the Greek Catholic Church in Greece.

See also
Catholic Church in Greece

References

External links
 http://www.catholic-hierarchy.org/bishop/bcalav.html

1881 births
1957 deaths
Greek Eastern Catholic bishops
20th-century Roman Catholic titular bishops
Eastern Catholic bishops in Turkey